David Leonard Clarke (3 November 1937 – 27 June 1976) was an English archaeologist and academic. He is well known for his work on processual archaeology.

Early life and education
Clarke was born in Kent, England. He studied at Peterhouse, University of Cambridge, from which he obtained his PhD in 1964 under the supervision of Grahame Clark.

Academic career
He became a Fellow of Peterhouse, Cambridge in 1966. His teaching and writing, particularly in analytical archaeology in 1967, transformed European archaeology in the 1970s. It demonstrated the importance of systems theory, quantification, and scientific reasoning in archaeology, and drew ecology, geography, and comparative anthropology firmly within the ambit of the subject. Never really accepted by the Cambridge hierarchy, he was nevertheless loved by his students for his down-to-earth, inclusive attitudes toward them.
In 1970, he published his PhD thesis about British and Irish Bell Beaker pottery.

Clarke died in 1976 as a result of thrombosis arising from a gangrenous twisted gut.

Selected works

References

External links
Quote from David Clarke, from his 1973 article in Antiquity called The Loss of Innocence. Antiquity 47:100.

Clarke, David Leonard
Clarke, David Leonard
Clarke, David Leonard
People from Kent
Alumni of Peterhouse, Cambridge
Fellows of Peterhouse, Cambridge